Arlo Bates (December 16, 1850 – August 25, 1918) was an American author, educator and newspaperman.

Biography
Arlo Bates was born at East Machias, Maine. He graduated from Bowdoin College in 1876. In 1880 Bates became the editor of the Boston Sunday Courier (1880–1893) and afterward became professor of English at the Massachusetts Institute of Technology. He was elected a Fellow of the American Academy of Arts and Sciences in 1900.

List of works
Novels:
The Pagans (1884)
The Wheel of Fire (1885)
The Philistines (1888)
Albrecht (1890)
The  Puritans (1899)
Love in a Cloud (1900)

Collected Poems:
Berries of the Brier (1886)
Sonnets in Shadow, (1887)
a Poet and his Self (1891)
Told in the Gate (1892)
The Torchbearers (1894)
Under the Beech Tree (1899)

Collected Criticisms:
Talks on Writing English (1897)
Talks on the Study of Literature (1898)
The Diary of a Saint (1902)
Talks on Teaching Literature (1906)

Collected Stories:
The Intoxicated Ghost (1908)

In 1912 he wrote an introduction to E. P. Whipple's Charles Dickens.

Notes

References

External links
Arlo Bates papers at Bowdoin College
 
 
 

1850 births
1918 deaths
American newspaper editors
19th-century American novelists
Novelists from Massachusetts
Bowdoin College alumni
Fellows of the American Academy of Arts and Sciences
MIT School of Humanities, Arts, and Social Sciences faculty
People from East Machias, Maine
American male novelists
19th-century American male writers
American male non-fiction writers
Members of the American Academy of Arts and Letters